Annals of Behavioral Medicine is a monthly peer-reviewed medical journal published by Oxford University Press on behalf of the Society of Behavioral Medicine. It publishes original research on behavioral medicine and the integration of biological, psychosocial, and behavioral factors and principles. The editor-in-chief is Tracey Revenson (City University of New York).

It is the flagship journal of the Society of Behavioral Medicine and was established in 1979.

Abstracting and indexing 
The journal is abstracted and indexed in:

According to the Journal Citation Reports, the journal has a 2020 impact factor of 4.908.

References

External links 
 

Behavioral medicine journals
Springer Science+Business Media academic journals
English-language journals
Publications established in 1979
Bimonthly journals